"Cross You Out" is a song by British singer Charli XCX featuring American singer Sky Ferreira, released as the first promotional single from Charli XCX's third album Charli on 16 August 2019. It was produced by A. G. Cook and Lotus IV.

Background and lyrics
Charli XCX stated that the song was written "about leaving some pretty traumatic people from my past behind me". NME opined that the track is "a ballad about finally severing ties with someone – and not feeling bad about it".

Critical reception
Reviewing for Pitchfork, Cat Zhang noted that the track "launches with thudding electronics and bright keys," but "simmers down as Charli begins singing, her voice Auto-Tuned and vulnerable." Zhang further stated that "glitchy metallics [of the track] preserve the (un)conventional Charli sound." Rolling Stone critic Claire Shaffer called the track a "synth-heavy club banger of a breakup song" with "synths that soar as high as a Gothic cathedral", judging its lyrics to be about "finding closure and liberation in the end of a relationship". Stereogums James Rettig described the track's chorus as "booming," while Rania Aniftos of Billboard characterised the song as a "glittery pop tune". Helen Brown thought that the track is driven by an "industrial drone of intergalactic hangar doors opening and closing, with the sweet, high vocals drifting weightless above."

Charts

References

2019 singles
2019 songs
Charli XCX songs
Sky Ferreira songs
Songs written by A. G. Cook
Songs written by Charli XCX
Songs written by Linus Wiklund
Songs written by Noonie Bao